Up Front is an album led by bassist David Williams but often credited to pianist Cedar Walton. Walton and Williams, along with drummer Billy Higgins, performed as a long-running trio under Walton's name. The album was recorded in 1986 and released on the Dutch Timeless label.

Reception

AllMusic awarded the album 4 stars.

Track listing 
 "Up Front" (David Williams)
 "Django" (John Lewis)
 "Let's Call This" (Thelonious Monk)
 "Everything Must Change" (Benard Ighner)
 "Good Bait" (Tadd Dameron, Count Basie)
 "Mode for Joe" (Cedar Walton)

Personnel 
Cedar Walton – piano 
David Williams – bass
Billy Higgins – drums

References 

Cedar Walton albums
David "Happy" Williams albums
1987 albums
Timeless Records albums